Judah & the Lion are an American Alternative rock and folk band from Nashville, Tennessee, formed in 2011. Currently the band consists only of Judah Akers (vocals, guitar) and Brian Macdonald (mandolin, vocals).

History 

The original members of the band met while attending Belmont University in Nashville. At Belmont, Akers was a baseball player, Zuercher was studying the banjo, and Macdonald was studying the mandolin. The band won Belmont's 2012 Best of the Best competition. The band released their first EP, First Fruits, on June 19, 2012.

Judah & the Lion released the EP Sweet Tennessee on April 16, 2013. It reached No. 2 on the Billboard Bluegrass Albums chart, No. 9 on the Heatseekers Albums chart, and No. 15 on the Folk Albums chart. In 2014, the band opened for Drew Holcomb and the Neighbors.

The band released their debut full-length studio album, Kids These Days, on September 9, 2014; it entered Billboards Heatseekers chart at No. 2 and the Folk Albums chart at No. 4 in its debut week. During their touring schedule in support of Kids These Days, Judah & the Lion opened for Mat Kearney and Ben Rector. During their headlining tour, they performed for the first time in Sweden in 2015 and wrote a song for their fans titled "Stockholm", which would be included on their next album Folk Hop n’ Roll. They performed on Late Show with David Letterman on February 20, 2015.

Judah & the Lion released their second studio album, Folk Hop n' Roll, on March 4, 2016, putting them at No. 3 on the Alternative New Artist Chart. The album reached No. 2 on the Billboard Heatseekers Albums chart, No. 7 on the Billboard Americana/Folk Albums chart, and No. 17 on the Billboard Independent Albums chart. The album's sound was a mix of Americana, club pop, and hip-hop, which was polarizing to some of their longtime fans. In November 2016, Judah & the Lion released the Take It All Back 2.0 + Stockholm EP. The single "Take It All Back" reached No. 19 on the Hot AC Chart and No. 1 on Billboards Alternative Songs chart for three consecutive weeks. The single was certified gold in September 2017 and platinum in October 2019. Like Kids These Days, Folk Hop n' Roll was produced by Dave Cobb. Cobb recorded the songs in a series of quick takes, aiming for performances that sounded real and raw rather than polished and perfect. The recording was completed in two weeks. The songs on Folk Hop n' Roll incorporate fuzz bass, hip hop percussion and distorted banjo riffs.

In January 2017, Billboard magazine named Judah & the Lion their first "Chartbreaker" artist. The same month, on January 12, 2017, the band made an appearance on Conan. Other television appearances in 2017 included The Late Late Show with James Corden on March 14, Good Morning America on June 5, and Jimmy Kimmel Live! on September 18.

The band toured the US, Canada and Europe in support of Folk Hop n' Roll. They made festival appearances at Bonnaroo, SunFest, Firefly, Governors Ball, Music Midtown, and Hangout Fest. They opened for Twenty One Pilots on their Emotional Roadshow Tour, Incubus and Jimmy Eat World on the 8 Tour in the US, and Kaleo's Express Tour in Canada and Europe.

Judah & the Lion headed back into the studio in early 2017 to record four new songs dubbed the Going to Mars Collection, which, when combined with Folk Hop n' Roll, make up Folk Hop n' Roll Deluxe. On March 10, 2017, Folk Hop n' Roll Deluxe was released. The rebooted version of the album includes the band's string quartet arrangement of "Take It All Back", "Suit and Jacket", which peaked at No. 4 on the Alternative Radio charts, and "Going to Mars", which peaked at No. 17 on the Alternative Radio charts.

The band released their third album, Pep Talks, on May 3, 2019. The album's seventeen songs explore thematic elements such as divorce and alcoholism intermixed with tracks covering lighter topics. It peaked at No. 18 on the Billboard 200 and No. 3 on the Alternative Albums chart, and features tracks with Kacey Musgraves and Jon Bellion. The single "Over My Head" reached No. 10 on the Billboard Alternative Songs chart, and "Why Did You Run?" reached No. 11 on Alternative Songs. The majority of the songs were written while the band was on the road touring on their previous album. The style of the album includes elements of folk, hip-hop, pop, and EDM. Leading up to the album's release, the band played it on tour, also telling stories about its creation. The album was produced by the band, alongside Drew Long and Daniel James. Nashville Lifestyles Magazine praised Pep Talks, with writer Luke Levenson commenting, "The record is intensely personal, remitting lyrics and sensibilities born out of Akers' family struggles, but it's also typically innovative—giving folk instruments new latitude through hip-hop-leaning beat and avant-pop accessibility."

On August 8, 2019, the band added an eighteenth song, "Let Go", which was simultaneously announced as ESPN's College Football Anthem for the 2019 season. "Why Did You Run?" was included on the EA Sports FIFA 20 soundtrack, and "Alright" was included on the EA Sports NHL 20 soundtrack. The single "Never Give Up on You" was released on February 21, 2020, as the official club anthem of the Major League Soccer team Nashville SC.

The band performed on Today in May 2019, Late Night with Seth Meyers on May 2, 2019, and Jimmy Kimmel Live! on March 19, 2019. From July to November 2019, the band toured the US, Canada, and the UK. They performed at Lollapalooza, Hangout Music Festival, Forecastle Festival, Outside Lands, and Austin City Limits.

The band announced the exit of member Nate Zuercher on November 8, 2021.

Judah and the Lion released their fourth album, Revival, on June 10, 2022.

Members
Current members
 Judah Akers – guitar, lead vocals
 Brian Macdonald – mandolin, backing vocals

Past members
 Spencer Cross – drums
Nate Zuercher – banjo, backing vocals

Discography

Studio albums

Live albums

Extended plays

Singles

Notes

Awards and nominations

References

External links
 

Musical groups established in 2011
Musical groups from Nashville, Tennessee
2011 establishments in Tennessee
Indie rock musical groups from Tennessee
American folk musical groups
American indie folk groups